The 1978 Icelandic Cup was the 20th edition of the National Football Cup.

It took place between 30 May 1979 and 26 August 1979, with the final played at Laugardalsvöllur in Reykjavik. The cup was important, as winners qualified for the UEFA Cup Winners' Cup (if a club won both the league and the cup, the defeated finalists would take their place in the Cup Winners' Cup).

The 10 clubs from the 1. Deild entered in the last 16, with clubs from lower tiers entering in the three preliminary rounds. Teams played one-legged matches. In case of a draw, the match was replayed at the opposition's ground.

Fram Reykjavik won their third Icelandic Cup, beating Valur Reykjavik in the final. The club therefore qualified for Europe.

First round

Second round

Third round

Fourth round 

 Entry of ten teams from the 1. Deild

Quarter finals

Semi finals

Final 

 Fram Reykjavik won their third Icelandic Cup and qualified for the 1980–81 European Cup Winners' Cup.

See also 

 1979 Úrvalsdeild
 Icelandic Men's Football Cup

External links 
  1979 Icelandic Cup results at the site of the Icelandic Football Federation

Icelandic Men's Football Cup
Iceland
1979 in Iceland